Planinski Vestnik (translation: Alpine Gazette) is a Slovenian monthly magazine, published by the Alpine Association of Slovenia. It was first published in 1895 by the Association's predecessor, the Slovene Alpine Society.

Editors 
The following people have been editors-in-chief of the magazine:

See also
 List of magazines in Slovenia

References

External links
 

Magazines published in Slovenia
Magazines established in 1895
Mass media in Ljubljana
Climbing magazines
Mountaineering in Slovenia
Monthly magazines
Skiing mass media
Slovene-language magazines